Karl Philipp Freiherr von Greiffenclau zu Vollraths (sometimes also Greifenclau or Vollrads, 1690–1754) was the Prince-Bishop of Würzburg from 1749 to 1754.

Karl Philipp von Greiffenclau zu Vollraths was born in Vollraths on 1 December 1690, the son of Johann Erwein von Greiffenclau (d. 1727) und Anna Lioba von Sickingen-Sickingen. His father's brother, Johann Philipp von Greifenclau zu Vollraths, was the Prince-Bishop of Würzburg from 1699 to 1719.

He was made a canon (Domizellar) of Würzburg Cathedral in 1705. He studied at the University of Mainz, before being ordained as a priest on 30 May 1728. He served as rector of the University of Mainz from 1739 to 1749.

On 14 April 1749 the cathedral chapter of Würzburg Cathedral elected him to be Prince-Bishop of Würzburg, with Pope Benedict XIV confirming his appointment on 21 July 1749. He was consecrated as a bishop by Daniel Johann Anton von Gebsattel, auxiliary bishop of Würzburg on 5 October 1749.

Karl Philipp von Greiffenclau resumed the Schönborn patronage in Würzburg, and immediately after his reign of government had begun, Balthasar Neumann was reappointed as director of the Würzburg Residence.

He died of tuberculosis on 25 November 1754 and is buried in Würzburg Cathedral.

References

External links

Prince-Bishops of Würzburg
1690 births
1754 deaths
People from the Rheingau